The Witham to Maldon branch line is a closed railway line joining Maldon to the British railway network at Witham in Essex, England. It was extended to Woodham Ferris (later Woodham Ferrers) to give direct access to Southend-on-Sea, but that extension was not commercially successful.

The Woodham Ferrers extension was closed to passenger traffic in 1939 and completely in 1953. The original main line from Maldon to Witham also declined in passenger carryings; efforts to stimulate business included the introduction of low-cost diesel railbuses and a more intensive passenger service. This proved to be in vain and the passenger service was withdrawn in 1964. A residual goods service continued but, from 1980, the line was completely closed.

First proposals

In 1825, the Stockton and Darlington Railway opened and many communities were prompted to consider whether a railway was a means to increased prosperity locally. A meeting at Maldon in that year considered the matter, but it was considered that the time was not right.

After the opening of the London to Colchester line by the Eastern Counties Railway in 1843, local interests in Maldon proposed a branch line connecting Maldon to Braintree, crossing the ECR's main line at Witham. It was predicted that £200,000 would be enough for the construction; it was important to get goods to and from the town cheaply. The share allotment was heavily oversubscribed, mostly by London interests, with very little interest from Braintree.

Maldon and Braintree authorised
Plans were formulated and deposited in 1845 and, in the 1846 Parliamentary session, the Bill for the Maldon, Witham and Braintree Railway was passed, gaining the Royal Assent on 18 June 1846; share capital was £200,000.

The Act authorised construction of a double track railway from Maldon to Braintree by way of Heybridge, Langford, Wickham Bishops, Witham Faulkbourne, White Notley and Bulford.

The ECR had agreed the use of Witham station by MW&BR trains. The Eastern Counties Railways, controlled by George Hudson, saw the strategic advantage of the branches and, on 10 September 1846, the ECR offered to purchase the unconstructed railway for £6,300 with a bonus of 10 shillings per share. The MW&BR board considered this offer on 18 September 1846 and determined to accept it. The ECR takeover proceeded and was authorised by Act of 2 July 1847.

In March 1847, a contract for construction of the railway was awarded to Thomas Jackson of Pimlico. The ECR allowed planned improvements to the River Blackwater at Maldon, originally intended to sustain the declining harbour against competition from elsewhere, to be dropped. The authorised line was to cross the ECR main line a little to the east of Witham, but the ECR saw the impracticality of that, as it did not facilitate connection with the main line trains. Accordingly, the ECR altered the proposed route to make it two branch lines joining into Witham station by west-facing connections. The construction was designed as cheaply as possible, using timber for many underbridges and with lightly engineered station accommodation. An exception was the station building at Maldon, which was built in an unnecessarily extravagant style. David Waddington was seeking re-election to the Maldon parliamentary constituency and was Chairman of the company. Paye suggests that he appears to have enhanced the specification of the building in order to encourage employment locally, but Gairns provides a more prosaic reason, that of appealing to civic pride among the middle classes.

Opening
The construction was slow due to exceptionally bad weather, but progress was made and a goods train ran from Maldon to Braintree on 15 August 1848; this usage continued in order to consolidate the track. Captain George Wynne for the Board of Trade inspected the line on 29 (Paye) or 30 (Swindale) September 1848 and approved it for the running of passenger trains. Accordingly, passenger operation started on 2 October 1848. Five trains a day ran; the journey time was 20 minutes from Maldon to Witham and 40 minutes throughout from Maldon to Braintree.

The line had been built as double track in anticipation of heavy usage, but this did not materialise; traffic on the line was disappointing. In 1850, one track was removed and the material was used on relaying of track on the Colchester main line.

In 1862, the Great Eastern Railway was formed by amalgamation of certain companies, including the Eastern Counties Railway; the coat of arms of the borough of Maldon was included in the crest of the new GER.

Maldon to Woodham Ferris (later Ferrers) 

On 16 July 1883, the Great Eastern Railway received Parliamentary authorisation for the New Essex Lines project. This included a new line from Shenfield to Southend, which opened on 1 October 1889. A branch from that line, from Wickford to Southminster, preceded it and was opened on 1 June 1889. There was a station on that line called Woodham Ferris, later named Woodham Ferrers from 1 October 1913. A branch from Woodham Ferris to Maldon was opened, as part of the New Essex Lines project, to goods on 19 November 1888 and to passengers on 1 October 1889. There were stations at Cold Norton and Maldon West. Maldon station was renamed Maldon East on 1 October 1889.

The Woodham Ferris to Maldon line was intended to form a through passenger route between Colchester and Southend. Triangular junctions were made at Wickford, Maldon and Witham to enable this routing. Part of the rationale of the New Essex Lines scheme was the encouragement of passenger traffic between Colchester and Southend direct; however when the Southend line was completed, only one Saturday-only train each way was put on from March 1890. The train called at Maldon West. Usage of that was disappointing and, on 1 March 1895, the service was withdrawn and the spurs closed.

Indeed, the whole of the passenger operation on the Maldon to Woodham Ferrers section was poor. In an attempt to control costs, Conductor-Guard operation was brought into use from 2 October 1922. The Maldon curve was singled in 1924, Woodham Ferrers to Maldon was made a single signalling section by 1933. The losses were nevertheless unsustainable and the final passenger service ran from Woodham Ferrers to Maldon on 10 September 1939.

During World War II, a bomb fell on the main line near Ingatestone and the crater made the line there temporarily impassable. For two weeks, main line passenger trains ran via Woodham Ferrers and Maldon, reversing there. It was therefore said that the busiest passenger carryings on that part of the line were after closure to local passenger trains.

Nevertheless, the regular traffic on the line between Maldon and Woodham Ferrers was only a basic goods service and the poor financial results caused the line to be completely closed on 1 April 1953.

Witham to Maldon changes
 After closure of the Maldon to Woodham Ferrers line, the Maldon West goods yard, on the first part of that line, remained in use. It was closed on 1 September 1954 and all goods traffic was handled at the original Maldon (East) goods yard. However, that site was rather cramped and it proved impossible to handle the traffic there; Maldon West goods yard was reopened on 31 January 1957. Both goods yards were very confined. The goods service at Maldon West was ended on 31 January 1959.

Railbuses
Diesel multiple unit vehicles started operating on the lines from 14 June 1956. The light passenger carryings on the Witham to Maldon line and the Braintree branch encouraged consideration of low cost train operation. Diesel railbuses operating on lightly trafficked lines in the Federal Republic of Germany were considered to be successful, and some vehicles were acquired and introduced on the lines, from 7 July 1958. The vehicles were constructed by Waggon- und Maschinenbau GmbH Donauwörth. A more intensive passenger service was brought in for a time, and in June 1963 diesel multiple unit trains started operating.

Closure
Nevertheless the financial losses of the passenger operation on the Maldon branch were considered to be unacceptable, and the line was closed to passenger services on 7 September 1964. A goods service continued until 18 April 1966, after which the line was closed completely. The Witham to Braintree section of the original Maldon, Witham and Braintree Railway continues in use as the Braintree branch line.

After 1966 a stub of the branch line at Witham was used to serve an industrial site for delivery of steel by railway; this section finally closed in the early 1980s.

Restoring Your Railway Fund
This bid was unsuccessful. In March 2021, the bid was re-submitted as part of the third round of the Restoring Your Railway fund.

Topography

Witham to Maldon

 Witham; station on main line; opened 29 March 1843; still open;
 Wickham; opened 2 October 1848; renamed Wickham Bishops 1913; closed 7 September 1964;
 Langford; opened 2 October 1848; renamed Langford & Ulting 1923; closed 7 September 1964;
 Langford Junction; divergence of curve towards Woodham Ferris;
 Maldon East Junction; convergence of Woodham Ferris line;
 Maldon; opened 2 October 1848; renamed Maldon East 1889; renamed Maldon East and Heybridge 1907; closed 7 September 1964.

Woodham Ferrers to Maldon

 Woodham Ferris; opened 1 July 1889; renamed Woodham Ferrers 1 October 1913; renamed South Woodham Ferrers 20 May 2007; still open.
 Stow St Mary Halt; opened 24 September 1928; closed 11 September 1939; 
 Baron's Lane Halt; opened 10 July 1922; closed 11 September 1939;
 Cold Norton; opened 1 October 1889; closed 11 September 1939;
 Maldon West; opened 1 October 1889; closed 22 May 1916; reopened 1 August 1919; closed 11 September 1939;
 Maldon West Junction; divergence of curve to Langford Junction;
 Maldon East Junction''; above;
 Maldon East & Heybridge (above).

Infrastructure

There were six timber trestle viaducts on the line; one near the former Wickham Bishops station still remains, and is a scheduled monument.

The Engineer's Line Reference for the line is WIM.

Current usage
The section of trackbed linking the two former railway stations in Maldon has been used as the route of the Maldon bypass to the west of the town. The Blackwater Rail Trail is a linear path that follows much of the trackbed of the line between Fullbridge and Witham.

In January 2019, Campaign for Better Transport released a report identifying the line between Witham and Maldon was listed as Priority 2 for reopening. Priority 2 is for those lines which require further development or a change in circumstances (such as housing developments).

Notes

References

Rail transport in Essex
Railway lines opened in 1848
Closed railway lines in the East of England
Railway lines closed in 1966